Victor Grandia (born January 10, 1979 in Amsterdam, North Holland) is a former Dutch cricketer. A right-handed batsman and a right-arm medium-fast bowler, he has played just one ODI game to date, taking the wicket of Sanath Jayasuriya.

Grandia was part of the Dutch cricket team at the 2003 Cricket World Cup having played in List A cricket from 2002. He had previously toured England in 1996 with the Dutch Colts and played in the International Youth Tournament in 1997 in Bermuda.

Sources
Victor Grandia at Cricinfo

1979 births
Living people
Dutch cricketers
Netherlands One Day International cricketers
Sportspeople from Amsterdam
20th-century Dutch people
21st-century Dutch people